Hadith of neediness all beings to Allah (Persian:فقر و نیازمندی همه موجودات به خداوند) include some narrations are about the relation of Allah And Other beings. This Hadith refers to a rational rule, according to which, every things in the world is in need of something, namely Allah, which is self subsistence and needless to anything in existence. This narration is to explain the reason of neediness of all things and beings to Allah.

Hadith

First narration

Second narration

Third narration

Interpretation
This Hadith refers to intellectual rules which applied in the proofs of existence of God in wisdom and Islamic philosophy. The principle of neediness of creatures as effects to creator as cause is an intellectual rule undoubtedly. Both philosopher, theologian and mystics, each one of them according to their idioms, refer to the principle. For instance, theologian seek the neediness in the light of Hodouth or Creation.

See also
 :fa:برهان امکان فقری

http://www.noormags.com/view/fa/articlepage/37097/228/text

References

Hadith